Albert Nathaniel Whiting (July 3, 1917 – June 4, 2020) was an American academic who was President and Chancellor of North Carolina College (which became North Carolina Central University) from 1966 to 1983. He was born in Navesink, New Jersey in July 1917, and served in the U.S. armed forces during World War II. He received his PhD from the American University in 1952. Whiting served as Dean of the Faculty of Morgan State College before becoming president and Chancellor of North Carolina College. He was married to Lottie Luck, who predeceased him in 2004 at the age of 85.

References

1917 births
2020 deaths
People from Monmouth County, New Jersey
American centenarians
Men centenarians
Chancellors of North Carolina Central University
Presidents of North Carolina Central University
Morgan State University faculty